Mayai Lambi College, established in 1981, is a general degree college in Yumnam Huidrom, Manipur. It offers undergraduate courses in arts and sciences. It is affiliated to  Manipur University.

Accreditation
The college is recognized by the University Grants Commission (UGC).

See also
Education in India
Manipur University
Literacy in India
List of institutions of higher education in Manipur

References

Colleges affiliated to Manipur University
Educational institutions established in 1981
Universities and colleges in Manipur
1981 establishments in Manipur